Keep It to Yourself may refer to:
Keep It to Yourself (album), by MullMuzzler
"Keep It to Yourself" (Kacey Musgraves song)